General Lázár Mészáros (English: Lazarus Mészáros) (20 February 1796 in Baja – 16 November 1858 in Eywood), was the Minister of War during the 1848 Hungarian Revolution.

Biography
He was born into a noble family of landowners. His parents died when he was four; as a child he was moved from one relative to another. He had his schooling in Baja, Szabadka (today Subotica), Pest and Pécs. Mészáros dropped out of his studies of law and joined the military.

Military career
In 1813, he became Lieutenant in a cavalry regiment in Bács-Bodrog County. He took part in the war against Napoleon. He was an officer of the 7th regiment of hussars from 1816 to 1837; then he was put in charge of the 5th regiment of hussars. He spent 18 years in Italy with his regiment. Field marshal Radetzky discovered the talented hussar officer, and, based on Radetzky's suggestion, he was promoted to be a colonel (1845). He also became his regiment's commandant.

Lázár Mészáros was a highly cultivated officer. He spoke seven languages. He was well versed in military matters, but he was also knowledgeable about society and the economy. In 1837, he started to correspond by mail with István Széchenyi. Mészáros was elected to be a mailing member of the Magyar Tudós Társaság (English: Hungarian Erudite Association, today: Hungarian Academy of Sciences). He chose the theme "Armed forces in modern bourgeois societies" for his inaugural.

Minister of War
On Lajos Kossuth's suggestion Lajos Batthyány appointed Mészáros to be Minister of War in the first responsible Hungarian government (22 March 1848). He took up his office after returning from Italy, where his regiment was posted (23 May). Some time later he became Major general of the Imperial and Royal forces and the commander of Imperial troops stationed on Hungarian territory.

As Minister of War, Lázár Mészáros was the intellectual founder of Hungary's defensive army. In July 1848, he became parliamentary delegate of his hometown, Baja, as well.

From the end of August, Mészáros decided to take personal control of the southern army. He travelled to Vajdaság (today Vojvodina, Serbia). On 30 September, he returned to the capital. Mészáros was the only member of Batthyány's government who did not resign. He became the member of the Territorial Defence Committee as the Minister of War. On 13 December, he took command of the northern army with 10,000 men. On 19 January 1849, he was discharged from his command, but he retained his post as Minister until the declaration of the Independence Statement. On 26 July, Mészáros resigned from all his remaining military functions, because he did not agree with the way Mór Perczel commanded the parts of the army under his control. After the Battle of Temesvár, and the ensuing failure of the war of independence, he left Hungary on 14 August 1849 for Turkey.

Exile
He left Turkey in May 1851. He settled at first in France, which he left upon Napoleon III's coup d'état in December 1851. He went to the Isle of Jersey. In the summer of 1853, he moved to the United States, where he tried farming in Iowa, and eventually settled in Flushing, New York. In October 1858, a short time before his death, Mészáros returned to England.

Last will
In his will, he requested that his remains not be returned to Hungary "until the last foreign soldier has left". He was reburied in Baja 133 years after his death, on 15 March 1991. The last Soviet soldiers – always seen by Hungarians as the successors of the Imperial Russian Army that crushed the Revolution 1848 – had left Hungary just months before.

The caption of his grave in Titley, England
To the memory of 
General Lázár Mészáros 
Minister of war 
And Commander in Chief 
Of the Hungarian Army in 1848–1849. 
Who was born at Baja in the county 
of Bács 1796 and died at Eywood 
6-th November 1858 in the 63 year of 
his age and 10-th of his exile. 
This stone is inscribed 
by his sorrowing friend 
J. E. H. Lady Langdale 
  
Mészáros Lázár Tábornoknak, 
A jó Hazafinak, 
A vitéz Katonának 
A nemes Barátnak. 

(The last sentence is in Hungarian. It means: To General Lázár Mészáros, the good Patriot, the valiant Soldier, the noble Friend.)

References

1796 births
1858 deaths
People from Baja, Hungary
Hungarian soldiers
Hungarian nobility
Forty-Eighters
Defence ministers of Hungary